Rubén Carlos Planchón Faureau (born August 4, 1982 in Dolores), commonly known as Rubén Planchón, is a Uruguayan footballer who plays as a defender for C.A. Rentistas in the Uruguayan Primera División.

Teams
  Villa Española 2003
  Plaza Colonia 2004
  Atenas 2005
  Cerro 2005-2006
  Central Español 2006-2007
  Juventud 2008-2009
  Cerrito 2009-2010
  Juventude 2010
  Rentistas 2011–present

Honours
Rentistas
Uruguayan Segunda División: 2010-11

External links
 
 

1982 births
Living people
People from Dolores, Uruguay
Uruguayan footballers
Association football defenders
Central Español players
Juventud de Las Piedras players
C.A. Cerro players
Sportivo Cerrito players
Esporte Clube Juventude players
C.A. Rentistas players
Expatriate footballers in Brazil